Peter Darvall  was the Vice-Chancellor and President of Monash University from 2002 until August 2003. Prior to this, he had a distinguished career in civil engineering and was at Monash for 33 years.  He was educated at Scotch College Melbourne.

Prior to being vice chancellor he was the Deputy Vice-Chancellor at Monash University, responsible for research and development and information technology, a position he held from 1993 to 2003, and was previously Dean of the Faculty of Engineering. Professor Darvall is the author of several books on mechanics and structures and has written numerous research papers on topics related to his areas of expertise. He has been a board member of the Prince Henry's Institute for Medical Research, Montech, the Victorian Strategic Industry Foundation (SIRF), the Baker Medical Research Institute, the Institute of Reproduction and Development and (CRCs) and the Cooperative Research Centres for Catchment Hydrology, Water Quality and Treatment, and Freshwater Ecology. He was also previously on the board of Melbourne Water.

References

Monash University
Officers of the Order of Australia
Academic staff of Monash University
Living people
People educated at Scotch College, Melbourne
Fellows of the Australian Academy of Technological Sciences and Engineering
Year of birth missing (living people)